Bloomfield is a town in Essex County, Vermont, United States. The population was 217 at the 2020 census. It is part of the Berlin, NH–VT Micropolitan Statistical Area.

History
In 1830, an act from the state General Assembly changed the name of the town from "Minehead" to "Bloomfield."

Geography
Bloomfield is in northeastern Essex County, along the Connecticut River, which forms the state line with New Hampshire. The town is bordered to the southwest by Brunswick, to the northwest by Lewis, at its northernmost point by Averill, and to the northeast by Lemington, Vermont, while to the southeast, across the river, it is bordered by the towns of Columbia and Stratford, New Hampshire. The settlement of Bloomfield is in the southern corner of the town, at the mouth of the Nulhegan River in the Connecticut, and connected by bridge to the village of North Stratford, New Hampshire.

Vermont Route 102 follows the Connecticut River along the southeastern edge of the town, leading northeast  to Colebrook, New Hampshire, and south  to Guildhall, Vermont, while Vermont Route 105 leads west up the Nulhegan River  to Island Pond.

The highest point in the town is  along the northeast boundary.

Much of the town's land is at a high elevation, but the population is concentrated along the river where the elevation is much lower.

Climate

A weather station was run in the town from 1906 to 1968. It was located at the southeast edge of town, near Lyman Falls along the Connecticut River.

Demographics

At the 2000 census there were 261 people in 101 households, including 75 families, in the town.  The population density was 6.5 people per square mile (2.5/km2). There were 191 housing units at an average density of 4.7 per square mile (1.8/km2).  The racial makeup of the town was 95.40% White, 1.53% Native American, 0.38% Asian, and 2.68% from two or more races.
Of the 101 households 34.7% had children under the age of 18 living with them, 61.4% were married couples living together, 6.9% had a female householder with no husband present, and 25.7% were non-families. 23.8% of households were one person and 13.9% were one person aged 65 or older.  The average household size was 2.58 and the average family size was 3.03.

The age distribution was 27.2% under the age of 18, 4.2% from 18 to 24, 29.9% from 25 to 44, 23.8% from 45 to 64, and 14.9% 65 or older.  The median age was 39 years. For every 100 females, there were 119.3 males.  For every 100 females age 18 and over, there were 108.8 males.

The median household income was $33,500 and the median family income  was $39,167. Males had a median income of $27,708 versus $20,357 for females. The per capita income for the town was $17,224.  About 3.2% of families and 4.0% of the population were below the poverty line, including none of those under the age of eighteen and 7.7% of those sixty-five or over.

References

 
Towns in Vermont
Berlin, New Hampshire micropolitan area
Vermont populated places on the Connecticut River
Towns in Essex County, Vermont